The Micklethwait Baronetcy, of Iridge Place in the County of Sussex, was a title in the Baronetage of the United Kingdom. It was created on 27 July 1838 for Peckham Micklethwait. The baronetcy was in honour of him having rescued Princess Victoria when her carriage bolted during a visit to Hastings in 1834. Micklethwait served as High Sheriff of Sussex in 1848. The title became extinct on his death in 1853.

Micklethwait baronets, of Iridge Place (1838)
Sir (Sotherton Branthwayt) Peckham Micklethwait, 1st Baronet (1786–1853)

References

Langdon, Christopher. Square Toes and Formal: Sketches of Some of the People and Places Who Have Been Associated With Young Coles & Langdon Over the Past 180 Years, page 8.

Extinct baronetcies in the Baronetage of the United Kingdom